Jebsen & Jessen Group is a diversified industrial group with operation offices across South East Asia and beyond. It is a third generation family-owned enterprise and part of the Jebsen & Jessen Family Enterprise.

Company Information 
Headquartered in Singapore with five regional business units across ASEAN, Jebsen & Jessen Group had a turnover of S$800 million in  2021, employs over 2,550 employees and has more than 50 subsidiaries and associate companies.

The company has several joint ventures including JJ-Lurgi Engineering (a joint venture with Air Liquide), JJ-LAPP (a joint venture with Lapp Holding Asia), and JJ-Pun (a joint venture with Serge Pun & Associates Group).

In May 2011, company executives indicated that the company has an acquisition war chest of SGD 250 million to support its growth strategy.

History 
Part of a global family enterprise that dates back to a trading partnership formed in Hong Kong in 1895. Jebsen & Jessen Group was formally incorporated in 1963 with operations in Singapore and Malaysia, and subsequently set up offices throughout South East Asia. By 1971 the company had more than 600 employees and was trading pharmaceuticals, engineering, photographic products, construction equipment and home appliances.

In the early 1970s the company acquired agencies for luxury watch brands, and also formed an agreement with Demag AG and set up mechanical handling engineering in 1972, trading and manufacturing hoists and cranes. In 1976 the company established Jebsen & Jessen Packaging.

In 1982 the group holding company Jebsen & Jessen (SEA) Pte Ltd was set up, its three departments included Engineering, Manufacturing and Trade & Industry. In 1986 MHE-Demag became a 50/50 joint venture between Jebsen & Jessen (SEA) and Demag. By the 25th anniversary in 1988, the Group had over 30 subsidiaries and employed 1,000 people.

On March 1, 1992, JJ-Lurgi was formed as a 50/50 joint venture between Jebsen & Jessen (SEA) and Lurgi AG. Current Chairman Heinrich Jessen joined the company as environment, health and safety manager in 1995.

In 2004 the group began a 50/50 joint venture with German Lapp Kable, forming JJ-Lapp Cable. The group obtained ISO 14001 and OHSAS certifications across its 40 subsidiaries in 2004.

In 2010, expanded regional reach by opening an office in Cambodia. and in July 2011, it entered Myanmar with a 50/50 joint venture with family-owned Serge Pun & Associates Group (SPA Group), forming JJ-Pun (S) Pte Ltd.

The group announced its acquisition of Halcyon Offshore, a leading offshore and marine services company on May 28, 2012.

In March 2014, Jebsen & Jessen Ingredients made the move into manufacturing malted ingredients, signing a 50:50 joint venture agreement with UK firm Muntons.

In January 2015, MHE-Demag acquired Demag Cranes & Components Australia.

In March 2015, JJ-Lapp Cable acquired a 100% stake in PT JJ-Lapp Cable SM (JJSMI). This comes five years after JJ-Lapp Cable and PT Sinarmonas entered a joint-venture relationship.

In October 2015, the group divested their Communications and Healthcare divisions.

In June 2016, JJ-Muntons opened the new 3,000sqm specialty malted manufacturing facility in Chonburi, Thailand.

In November 2016, MHE-Demag opened South East Asia's largest crane manufacturing plant in Malaysia.

In January 2018, the group and sister company Jebsen Group in China announced the establishment of a joint venture of equals in Greater China between Jebsen & Jessen Ingredients (JJING) and Jebsen Industrial Specialty Ingredients & Solutions Business (JI-SI&S).

Businesses 
The group has five core business units: Cable Technology, Ingredients, Life Sciences, Packaging, and Technology.

Cable Technology 
JJ-LAPP was founded as a joint venture between Jebsen & Jessen Group and LAPP Holding Asia, a subsidiary of LAPP Group in Germany. J-LAPP’s expertise ranges from industrial connection technology, automation, fire protection system, cable management system, and safety technology. In 2010, JJ-LAPP established its first manufacturing site in South East Asia.

Ingredients 
Jebsen & Jessen Ingredients distributes specialty chemicals, including additives, fillers, pigments, resins, solvents, cross linker, flame retardants, monomers/polymers, and performance chemicals to manufacturing industries; amino acids and protein sources to animal feed manufacturers; food additives and ingredients for the treatment and flavoring of food and beverages; and chemicals for the pharma industries.

Life Sciences 
JJ-Lurgi Engineering offers technologies and engineering services for oil seed extraction, natural oils and fats production, and edible oil and bio fuel processing. In 2022, the company received the Asia’s Best Performing Companies award for its commendable performance in Malaysia, Indonesia and China.

Packaging 
Jebsen & Jessen Packaging manufactures and supplies foam, plastic, paper, wood and integrated packaging products as well as moulded foam components, engineered foam for construction and related design & engineering services.

Technology 
Jebsen & Jessen Technology engages in the distribution of industrial and commercial pumps, motors, turf and irrigation management systems, as well as equipment for transport, chemical, and precision engineering industries. This business unit also distributes offshore and marine cables under the brand Cables International.

References 

Manufacturing companies of Singapore
Joint ventures
Conglomerate companies
Manufacturing
Engineering companies
Privately held companies